Niranjan Pujari (born 1961) is a member of the Odisha Legislative Assembly, the state assembly from Sonepur of the Indian state Odisha.

References

External links

 MLA Profile

Living people
1961 births
Members of the Odisha Legislative Assembly
Biju Janata Dal politicians
Odisha MLAs 2019–2024